Luca Ricciardi (born 7 August 1989) is an Italian footballer who plays as a midfielder for Matese.

Club career
He made his Serie C debut for Latina on 4 September 2011 in a game against Siracusa.

On 25 September 2018, he joined Olympia Agnonese.

On 15 July 2019, he signed a 2-year contract with Fermana. On 20 August 2020 he moved to Rimini.

In December 2021, he moved to Matese.

References

External links
 

1989 births
Living people
People from Gaeta
Sportspeople from the Province of Latina
Footballers from Lazio
Italian footballers
Association football midfielders
Serie B players
Serie C players
Lega Pro Seconda Divisione players
Serie D players
Latina Calcio 1932 players
Pisa S.C. players
A.C. Tuttocuoio 1957 San Miniato players
S.S. Racing Club Roma players
S.S. Racing Club Fondi players
Fermana F.C. players
Rimini F.C. 1912 players
A.S.D. Football Club Matese players